Buddhism includes a wide array of divine beings that are venerated in various ritual and popular contexts. Initially they included mainly Indian figures such as devas, asuras and yakshas, but later came to include other Asian spirits and local gods (like the Burmese nats and the Japanese kami). They range from enlightened Buddhas to regional spirits adopted by Buddhists or practiced on the margins of the religion. 

Buddhists later also came to incorporate aspects from the countries to which it spread. As such, it includes many aspects taken from other mythologies of those cultures.

Buddhas

A Buddha is a being who is fully awakened and has fully comprehended the Four Noble Truths. In the Theravada tradition, while there is a list of acknowledged past Buddhas, the historical Buddha Sakyamuni is the only Buddha of our current era and is generally not seen as accessible or as existing in some higher plane of existence. The Pali literature of the Theravāda tradition includes tales of twenty-nine Buddhas, which are Sakyamuni and the twenty-eight Buddhas who preceded him.

Mahayana Buddhists venerate numerous Buddhas, more so than the Theravada tradition, including Maitreya and Amitābha, who are seen as beings of great wisdom and power who preside over pure lands that one can travel to after death. Mahayana and Vajrayana traditions also recognize five primary Buddhas: Vairocana, Aksobhya, Ratnasambhava, Amitābha, and Amoghasiddhi. Each is associated with a different consort, direction, aggregate (or, aspect of the personality), emotion, element, color, symbol, and mount. Other Buddhas besides these five include Bhaisajyaguru (the Buddha of medicine) and Nageshvara Raja (the king of the Nāgas). There is also the idea of the Adi-Buddha, the "first Buddha" to attain Buddhahood. Variously named as Vajradhara, Samantabhadra and Vairocana, the first Buddha is also associated with the concept of Dharmakaya.

In Tibetan Buddhism, several female Buddhas are also recognized, such as Tara, the most popular female Buddha in Tibetan Buddhism, who comes in many forms and colors. Other female Buddha figures include Vajrayogini, Nairatmya, and Kurukullā. Some historical figures are also seen as Buddhas, such as the Buddhist philosopher Nagarjuna and the figure of Padmasambhava.

Bodhisattvas

In Theravada Buddhism, bodhisatta is a term used mainly for Sakyamuni Buddha before his awakening. It is also commonly believed that the future Buddha, Maitreya (Pali: Metteya) currently resides in Tavatimsa Heaven, and this figure is one of the few bodhisattvas who have a prominent place in Theravada.

In Mahayana Buddhism, a bodhisattva is any being that has aroused bodhicitta (mind of awakening) and is thus working towards full Buddhahood. Bodhisattvas who are seen as powerful and highly advanced are highly venerated in this tradition. In the East Asian Buddhist traditions, which are mainly Mahayana, major bodhisattvas include: Guanyin, Maitreya, Samantabhadra, Manjushri, Ksitigarbha, Mahasthamaprapta, Vajrapani and Akasagarbha. Others bodhisattvas include Candraprabha, Suryaprabha, Bhaiṣajyasamudgata, Bhaiṣajyarāja, Akṣayamati, Sarvanivāraṇaviṣkambhin and Vajrasattva. The most popular bodhisattva in the East Asian pantheon is Guanyin (the East Asian form of the Indian Avalokitesvara), who is also believed by Buddhists to take on numerous manifestations, among which are several other bodhisattvas such as Cundi and Cintamanicakra. In addition, Buddhist traditions in different countries have also absorbed native deities into their localized Buddhist pantheon, sometimes as Bodhisattvas. Some examples are Guan Yu in Chinese Buddhism, who is venerated as Sangharama Bodhisattva (Chinese: 伽藍菩薩; Pinyin: Qiélán Púsà) as well as a deity, and Hachiman in Japanese Buddhism, who is venerated as the Bodhisattva Hachiman (Japanese: 八幡大菩薩; Rōmaji: Hachiman Daibosatsu).

In Tibetan Buddhism, a Vajrayana Buddhist tradition, the major bodhisattvas are known as the "eight great bodhisattvas": Ksitigarbha, Vajrapani, Akasagarbha, Avalokitesvara, Maitreya, Sarvanivāraṇaviṣkambhin, Samantabhadra and Manjushri. Other female Bodhisattvas include Vasudhara and Cundi. Followers of Tibetan Buddhism consider reborn tulkus such as the Dalai Lamas and the Karmapas to be emanations of bodhisattvas.

Dharmapala emanations 
In Tibetan Buddhism, there are numerous "dharma protectors" (dharmapalas) which are considered to be emanations of bodhisattvas. These include popular dharma protectors like: Ekajaṭī, Mahākāla, Palden Lhamo, and Hayagrīva.

Wisdom Kings

The Wisdom Kings (Sanskrit: Vidyārāja) are beings that are venerated in East Asian Buddhism and in Vajrayana Buddhism. They are often depicted with an aggressive or fierce appearance which symbolizes their power to get rid of negative forces. They are therefore an expression of the Buddha's compassion.

In East Asian Buddhism, The Five Wisdom Kings are often seen as emanations of the Buddhas. These five are:
Vajrayakṣa
Acala
Trailokyavijaya
Kuṇḍali
Yamantaka
Other important Wisdom Kings include

Ucchuṣma 
Mahamayuri
Hayagriva
Āṭavaka
Rāgarāja
Aparajita
Mahachakra
Padanaksipa

Devas

Devas are divine beings, though they are not all necessarily wise or on the Buddhist path and hence not final objects of refuge. They have very long lives which have much less suffering than humans, but are not immortal or immune from suffering. Some devas have no physical form and exist in the formless realms. None of them are creator gods, and they are neither omniscient nor omnipotent. With the spread of Buddhism, different cultures have also integrated or syncretized local deities into their pantheon of devas. For example, Chinese Buddhism venerates the Twenty-Four Protective Devas, which include both originally Indian deities, such as Mahesvara (Shiva), Sakra (Indra), Brahma, Sarasvati, Laksmi, Marici and Hariti, as well as a few deities integrated from Taoism, such as the Emperor Zi Wei and Leigong. Guan Yu, who is regarded as a god of war in Taoism, is also regarded as both a bodhisattva and a deva. In Japanese Buddhism, Shinto gods were also syncretized into the pantheon under the honji suijaku theory by being conflated with the Indian deities imported from Buddhism, such as Ugajin and Ōkuninushi.

Cāturmahārājakāyika devas 

These are the lowest level of divinity. The name refers to the Four Heavenly Kings (Cāturmahārāja) who rule over this world along with the assemblage or multitude (kāyika) of beings that dwell there.

The Four Heavenly Kings are the leaders of various beings who reside here:

Dhṛtarāṣṭra - Guardian of the East. Leader of the gandharvas and piśācas.
Virūḍhaka - Guardian of the South. Leader of the kumbhāṇḍas and pretas.
Virūpākṣa - Guardian of the West. Leader of the nāgas and pūtanas.
Vaiśravaṇa - Guardian of the North. Leader of the yakṣas and rākṣasas.

The Twenty Four Dharmapalas 
In Chinese Buddhism, there is a list of Twenty-Four Protective Deities (Chinese: 二十四諸天; pinyin: Èrshísì Zhūtiān). These dharmapalas (Dharma protectors) are seen as defenders of Buddhism and protectors of Buddhists against evil or harm. They are:

 Maheśvara (Shiva)
 Brahma
 Śakra (Indra)
 Lakshmi
 Sarasvati
 Vaiśravaṇa
 Virūḍhaka
 Dhṛtarāṣṭra
 Virūpākṣa
 Surya
 Chandra
 Guhyapāda
 Pañcika
 Skanda
 Pṛthvī
 Spirit of the Bodhi Tree
 Hārītī
 Mārīcī
 Sāgara
 Yama
 Kinnara King
 Emperor Zi Wei
 Emperor Dongyue
 Thunder God

Yidam 

The yidam, or ishta-devata, is a personal meditation deity. Though this term is used in many popular books on Buddhist Tantra, the term işţadevatā has not been attested in any Buddhist tantric text in Sanskrit. The unrelated Tibetan version of the term, possibly of entirely native origin, is yi-dam is said to be a contraction of Tib. yid-kyi-dam-tshig, meaning "samaya of mind"- in other words, the state of being indestructibly bonded with the inherently pure and liberated nature of mind.

The ishta-devata of Hinduism is an aspect of God for personal worship. In Buddhism, a yidam is a manifestation of enlightenment and may take the form of Sambhogakāya Buddhas, tantric deities such as Dakinis, bodhisattvas, Dharma protectors (Dharmapalas) or other historical figures such as past gurus or religious leaders.

Wrathful deities

In the Buddhist Tantras, Buddhas and Bodhisattvas often manifest in unusual and fierce forms, which are used in tantra as yidams or meditation deities. While some of these deities have a hideous and fierce appearance, they are not personifications of evil or demonic forces. The ferocious appearance of these deities is used to instill fear in evil spirits which threaten the Dharma.

Other beings

Asuras 

The Asuras, sometimes translated as Titans or Demigods, are often depicted as enemies of the Devas and fighting them in wars. They are said to have been defeated by the Devas, led by Sakra, king of the gods. They are often seen as being led by strong passions, such as hatred and greed.

Māra

Māra (literally meaning "death") refers to either a specific being, or to a class of beings, who are depicted as being antagonistic to the Buddha, Dharma and Sangha. As lord of the desire realm, Māra is depicted as working to keep beings under his control.

Yaksha

The yaksha are a broad class of nature-spirits, usually benevolent, who are caretakers of the natural treasures hidden in the earth and tree roots. Having been worshiped in India since before the Vedic period, Hinduism adopted the worship of yaksha like Kubera. Later their worship was adopted by Buddhism. In Jainism, yakshas were worshiped as shasana devatas from the beginning.

In Buddhism, it is believed that they reside deep under the Himalayas where they guard the wealth of the Earth. The yaksha are ruled over by Kubera, the lord of wealth.

In Burma there exists the popular worship of nature spirits called nats which are worshiped alongside of Buddhism.

Other spirit beings 
There are numerous otherworldly spirits and legendary creatures found in Buddhist texts and Buddhist mythology. Many of these are shared with Hindu mythology. These include:
Nāga, a serpentine deity or race in Hindu, Buddhist and Jain traditions
Garuḍas, eagly like beings
Apsaras female water spirits
Gandharvas, celestial musicians 
Kinnaras
Mahoragas
Kumbhanda
Parjanya
Maṇimekhalā

See also
 Buddhist cosmology
 Hindu deities
 Karma in Buddhism
 Religion in Asia

References

Further reading